William Lygon, 1st Earl Beauchamp (25 July 1747 – 21 October 1816), known as Lord Beauchamp of Powyke between 1806 and 1815, was a British politician.

Early life
Lygon was the son of Reginald Lygon (originally Reginald Pyndar), of Madresfield Court, Worcestershire, son of Reginald Pyndar and Margaret Lygon, daughter of William Lygon, of Madresfield Court, a descendant of Richard Lygon, of Madresfield Court, husband of the Honourable Anne Beauchamp (d. 1535), second daughter and co-heiress of Richard Beauchamp, 2nd Baron Beauchamp ("of Powyk"). His mother was Susanna Hanmer, daughter of William Hanmer, of Bettisfield, Flintshire. His father had assumed the surname of Lygon on succeeding to the Lygon estates of his maternal grandfather. He was educated at Christ Church, Oxford.

Parliament
Lygon was returned to Parliament as one of two representatives for Worcestershire in 1775, a seat he held until 1806, when he was raised to the peerage as Baron Beauchamp of Powyke, in the County of Worcester. He was further honoured in 1815 when he was made Viscount Elmley, in the County of Gloucester, and Earl Beauchamp.

Marriage
Lord Beauchamp married Catherine Denn, daughter of James Denn, in 1780. They had several children, including two British Army generals, Henry Lygon, 4th Earl Beauchamp and Edward Pyndar Lygon. He died suddenly at St James's Square, London, in October 1816, aged 69, and was succeeded in the earldom by his eldest son, William. The Countess Beauchamp died in March 1844.

References

External links

|-

1747 births
1816 deaths
People from Worcestershire (before 1974)
Alumni of Christ Church, Oxford
Members of the Parliament of Great Britain for Worcestershire
British MPs 1774–1780
British MPs 1780–1784
British MPs 1784–1790
British MPs 1790–1796
British MPs 1796–1800
Members of the Parliament of the United Kingdom for Worcestershire
UK MPs 1801–1802
UK MPs 1802–1806
UK MPs who were granted peerages
William 1
William
Peers of the United Kingdom created by George III